Calycopis isobeon, the dusky-blue groundstreak,  is a butterfly native to the Americas, ranging from Venezuela to central Texas. It is very similar to the red-banded hairstreak (Calycopis cecrops) and the two are sometimes treated as conspecific.

External links
Butterflies & Moths of North America

isobeon
Butterflies of North America
Butterflies described in 1872
Lycaenidae of South America
Taxa named by Arthur Gardiner Butler
Taxa named by Herbert Druce